The British Institute in Eastern Africa (BIEA) is headquartered in Nairobi, Kenya, and is dedicated to supporting historical, archaeological, and other social science and humanities research in eastern Africa. The BIEA is sponsored by the British Academy. 

The BIEA was founded in 1959 as the British Institute of History and Archaeology in East Africa. Its first director was the archaeologist Neville Chittick. The institute changed its name to the "British Institute in Eastern Africa" in 1970, and the BIEA's current facilities in Kileleshwa, Nairobi, include an extensive research library and office resources for visiting scholars. The BIEA sponsors a Graduate Attachment Scheme, as well as Humanities Research Fellowship program and an Archaeology Research Fellowship program.  

Membership to the BIEA is open to all.

Publications 
Two academic journals are currently produced by the BIEA, Azania: Archaeological Research in Africa and the Journal of Eastern African Studies.

Directors 
Neville Chittick (1961-1983)

John Sutton (1983-1998)

Paul Lane (1998-2006)

Justin Willis (2006-2009)

Ambreena Manji (2010-2014)

Joost Fontein (2014-2018)

Jane Humphris (2018-present), London

Freda Nkirote (2018-present), Nairobi

References

External links 
 https://www.biea.ac.uk/

British overseas research institutes
Organizations established in 1959
1959 establishments in Kenya